Sudhansu Sobhan Maitra was an Indian physician and a faculty member of Willingdon Hospital (present-day Ram Manohar Lohia Hospital). He was a graduate of Patna University and a World War II veteran for which he received a War Medal in 1944. The Government of India awarded him Padma Bhushan, the third highest Indian civilian award, in 1962. The Royal College of Physicians of Edinburgh elected him as a fellow in 1964.

References

Recipients of the Padma Bhushan in medicine
20th-century Indian medical doctors
Indian medical academics
Academic staff of Delhi University
Fellows of the Royal College of Surgeons of Edinburgh
Patna University alumni
Year of birth missing
Year of death missing
20th-century surgeons